The 2016 Kenyan Super Cup was a Kenyan football match contested by the 2015 Kenyan Premier League champions Gor Mahia and the 2015 FKF President's Cup champions Bandari. Bandari won my match 1–0 to deny Gor Mahia their third title in a row. As a result, Bandari claimed KSh.  in prize money while Gor Mahia collected  as runners-up.

Gor Mahia controversially skipped the medal ceremony after the match, with KPL chief executive officer Jack Oguda condemning the actions as "uncalled for" and "unsportsmanlike" the following day. He also announced that the club would face punishment, but did not specify what the punishment would be or when it would be delivered.

Road to the Cup

2015 Kenyan Premier League standings

2015 FKF President's Cup bracket

Match details

References

Super Cup
2016